This list of telephone area name changes in the United Kingdom documents proposed and actual changes to the names of telephone areas, made in the third millennium by Oftel and its successor Ofcom, with assistance from BT and Cable & Wireless plc (C&W).

Background
In 2003, Oftel published a proposal to create a National Telephone Numbering Plan (NTNP). This draft plan proposed changing the names of many areas from whatever name BT had previously used. Following responses from BT, C&W and others the final plan was published with a number of amendments incorporated, followed by a minor revision a few weeks later. A few months later, the data and the responsibility for maintaining it was passed to Ofcom.

Ofcom's data is contained in two files: the NTNP PDF file (updated several times per year) and the SABC CSV file for electronic download (published weekly). Although the data in these files should be identical, there have been and still are many differences between them.

In one background document from 2004, Ofcom states that In order to conform to the National Telephone Numbering Plan (NTNP), the names of the following Geographic Area Codes have changed - 1248, 1268, 1275, 1276, 1291, 1293, 1306, 1322, 1327, 1334, 1344, 1354, 1356, 1375, 1384, 1394, 1425, 1438, 1442, 1451, 1454, 1461, 1470, 1471, 1477, 1478, 1485, 1488, 1489, 1491, 1543, 1561, 1562, 1582, 1588, 1598, 1661, 1668, 1675, 1680, 1681, 1684, 1688, 1689, 1695, 1707, 1720, 1727, 1737, 1744, 1753, 1770, 1784, 1806, 1821, 1856, 1870, 1877, 1883, 1885, 1889, 1895, 1908, 1920, 1922, 1926, 1928, 1932, 1952, 1953, 1963, 1980, 1983, 1984, 1992.

The Ofcom proposal also contained a large number of spelling mistakes in the proposed area code names. Some of those errors were rectified within weeks or months, while others have still not been fixed eight years later. Additionally, several other areas changed their name after suggestions by BT and/or C&W, although Ofcom originally had no plans to change them. There are also several areas which changed name but are not listed above. Additionally some names were changed in one Ofcom document but were not updated in the other Ofcom document until several years later. Some have still not been updated or corrected.

Nine more place names were fixed in a reissued NTNP PDF document in mid-December 2011.

List
The proposed and actual changes, along with the list of implementation errors, are detailed below.

References

Telephone numbers in the United Kingdom
United Kingdom communications-related lists